Birch beer is a beverage, commonly found as a carbonated soft drink made from herbal extracts and birch bark. It was originally made from the extracts of both oak and pine barks (which are sometimes combined). There are dozens of brands of birch beer available.

Ingredients 
The one ingredient used in all recipes of birch beer is birch sap. Most recipes use some fermentation, but the amount of alcohol in the beverage depends on the brand. The process of fermenting birch syrup is done using baker's yeast. The process of fermentation is done to decompose sugar to alcohol. Other common ingredients include sugar, cinnamon, vanilla beans, and water. Homemade recipes of birch beer also include honey and malt.

Birch extract preparation
Various types of birch beer made from birch bark are available as well, distinguished by color. The color depends on the species of birch tree from which the birch oil is extracted (though enhancements by artificial coloring are commonly present). Popular colors include brown, red, blue and clear (often called white birch beer), though others are possible.

After the bark is collected, it is distilled to make birch oil. The oil is added to the carbonated drink to give it the distinctive flavor, reminiscent of wintergreen and methyl salicylate. Black birch is the most common source of extract in the northeastern region of the United States, where that species is indigenous.

Birch beer varieties
Birch beer is most commonly found in the Northeastern United States and Newfoundland in Canada.

In the dairy country of southeastern and central Pennsylvania, an ice cream soda made with vanilla ice cream and birch beer is called a "birch beer float", while chocolate ice cream and birch beer makes a "black cow".

Alcoholic birch beer, in which the birch sap is fermented, has been known from at least the seventeenth century. The following recipe is from 1676:

See also
 Birch syrup
 Spruce beer
 Sarsaparilla (soft drink)
 Root beer

References

External links

Cuisine of Philadelphia
Cuisine of Pennsylvania
New England cuisine
Soft beers and malt drinks
Soft drinks
Tree tapping
Non-timber forest products